is a Japanese visual novel developed by PrincessSoft which was released on October 7, 2004. It has been adapted into an anime television series animated by Zexcs and aired from October to December 2004 with original character designs by Aoi Nishimata. The series of half-length episodes aired in Japan in October 2004 (back-to-back with W~Wish, a separate series), with the last episode ending a few months later.

A PS2 adaptation of the series was exclusively released in Japan during October 2004. A sequel with different characters, called Finalist, was released a year later, in which each of the female characters was designed by different character artists.

Storyline 
The situation of Final Approach involves an experimental government operation (dubbed the "R.T.P." by Japanese Congress) to oppose the declining birthrates of Japan, circa this period in time. The primary decision (which is implied to be without the Japanese citizens' representation and approval) was to arrange a national project in which young citizens of opposite sexes are to be paired together in marriage, and therefore in parenthood. This, in theory of the story and in today's world, would produce an astonishing net increase in childbirth, if young couples were to begin having children during an early relationship.

While the economical and political gains are great, the social and emotional aspects of the "subjects" in the project are easily assumed adamant in defending the previous method of marriage. Thus, the Japanese government decided to test the project on an experimental level, i.e. with one couple at a time.

The Mizuhara siblings are the first to be chosen for the R.T.P. project. The brother and the sister, Ryo and Akane, have long been living together in the same apartment. Still in public school, the two have endured a difficult life after their parents' death some years back (their cause of death is unexplained); the siblings only managed their orphaned days within the hands of their young guardian, Haru, who they also work for in his café. Ryo, the main protagonist, has assured to himself that all is well; he and his sister are living on well-paid wages, and he only needs his sister. The vision of his future is soon to be shattered by the R.T.P. when his planned fiancée, Shizuka, enters his apartment one night with several government bodyguards. By some preliminary actions taken by the government (as precautions), Ryo is forced to house his new wife-to-be, despite his refusal.

The whole series continues from there, presenting the new day-to-day events of the Mizuhara siblings with Shizuka.

Main characters 

 (anime only)
Ryo is a teenage boy in the 11th grade. Living with Akane since a young age, Ryo is seen as the ideal brotherly figure to his sister, to the extent of being humorously overprotective. When he met his fiancée for the first time, he refused to marry her, both on government basis and personal beliefs. Throughout the series (except the end), Ryo has always been in defiance to the arranged marriage, and he exercises that by rejecting Shizuka and her attempts to court him.

In trying to change Shizuka's mind about the marriage, Ryo has tried a few methods. One such method is dating one of his friends, Emiho. Shizuka dismisses it as an act, meant to change Emiho's mind on arranged marriages (because Emiho herself has an arranged marriage). In later episodes however, it is shown that Shizuka's approval is only a pretense for the emotional pain she is going through, caused by the sadness welling up inside her (mainly due to Ryo's relationship with Emiho). The façade did not last long; after being reprimanded by Ryo for invading the privacy of his relationship with Emiho (in which Shizuka did only to please Ryo; she was merely keeping track and taking care of their needs), the pretext starts to fade as Ryo begins to ignore all verbal and eye contact with Shizuka (Being as retribution/punishment or as another refusal method is up to debate). Ryo's silence to his fiancée also did not last long

The dating relationship between Ryo and Emiho dissolves after Emiho's rescue from her engagement meeting. Akane narrates that none of the two said they have stopped dating, but after the engagement meeting, Ryo and Emiho act normally as they did before the dating relationship. Ryo finally confirms feelings for Shizuka towards the end of the series, kissing her close to the end of episode 12.

Shizuka is the fiancée of Ryo. She is in the 10th grade, but used "political power" to transfer herself to Ryo's 11th grade class. Her feelings and hopes for Ryo were confirmed when her fiancé began dating Emiho.

Shizuka is mostly Ryo's fiancée because of the Japanese government's secret childbirth program, but disclosures later on reveal that her grandfather has a hand in the matter. When her grandfather was young, he fell in love with a woman from a lower class, but they could not get married due to his parents' disapproval via class status. Instead, he married the woman his family picked. He eventually accepted and fell in love with his wife and forgot about his first love. When his wife died two years before the events of Final Approach, Shizuka's grandfather went back to reminiscing about his first love. After some research, he found out she had already died. In studying some more, he found out the woman had two grandchildren (who were Ryo and Akane), both of close ages to his grandchild. The grandfather, knowing this, asks Shizuka to marry Ryo, as a sign of realization of his lost love, which seems to be his only wish left in his lifetime. Shizuka, obeying and honoring her grandfather, carries on his request, despite her being unhappy at first with a forced marriage. Like Ryo, she at first did not want to be in a planned marriage where she didn't know who her spouse was. The reason Shizuka didn't tell Ryo about the story was because she thought he would pity her, a love relationship that Shizuka would not have been happy or satisfied with. Fortunately, Shizuka was in love with Ryo so deeply and strongly that she didn't care if Ryo pitied her or not. In the end, Ryo, realizing the real Shizuka and her passionate love, came to her hometown, fully accepting their marriage status from having developed so strong of feelings for his fiancée.

Akane is Ryo's sister, a gentle-minded girl attending the 10th grade class. After her parents died, she had since always look up to Ryo and developed a close affection for her brother based on dependency. Throughout the story, Akane doesn't seem to mind Shizuka and her engagement to Ryo (albeit at one time, she was afraid that Ryo would forget about her after he marries). A sisterhood between the two girls soon formed, in which Akane can perceive Shizuka's emotions and struggles.

In one episode when Akane falls ill to a cold, she reveals her deep reliance on Ryo via dreams bearing past memories and by brooding about the future where she believes Ryo might leave his sister for his new, demanding life. The fact that she fears this happening and that she finds happiness in her brother's presence may imply that Akane has diminutive amorous feelings for Ryo. In spite of what may be, Akane does not object to her brother's planned marriage (however, there is little evidence that she supports the engagement, thus placing her beliefs on the marriage as somewhat passive).

A female classmate and a friend of Ryo. She differs from most of the cast in that she has a collected personality and speaks with logic in mind.

Coming from a wealthy family, it wasn't long before Emiho was in a political marriage; Ryo felt a connection to her due to his similar situation. A relationship of interest was formed thereafter, in which Ryo tried to change Shizuka's mind on their engagement. Emiho herself discovered another perspective of love in her relationship with Ryo (in complement with her previous philosophy on arranged marriages and a person's will in it), during which she exhibits with feelings for Ryo. Their relationship ended after an incident with Emiho meeting her fiancé, though neither of them stated that they have broken up.

A female classmate and a friend of Ryo. Spunky and sometimes hot-tempered, Miki slacks in schoolwork while aspiring to be an idol singer, preferably well known.

It is suggested that Miki. This is thought of during an episode where the cast is skiing on a mountain and becomes trapped in the ensuing blizzard. During the scene where the group is taking shelter within a log cabin, Shizuka recommends sharing body warmth as a source of heat. Miki, after concluding that Akane will be cared for by Ryo, proposes to Emiho to be her sharing partner, while hinting that homosexual acts will be involved. Later on, when the group settled themselves in a nearby hot spring, Miki compliments Akane about her smooth skin, and succeeds it with a poke on one of Akane's breasts (after which Miki "plays" with Akane).

A young waitress who works in a café known as Plavi. She is characterized as being kind and thoughtful, while of a beautiful complexion. While working for the café, she also secretly is the girlfriend of the manager, Mukasa Haruki a.k.a. Haru (who also happens to own the entire café). The end of the series sees the couple as being open about their relationship by being married.

While not involving herself, she however is able to persuade Ryo into reexamining his arranged marriage, and ultimately his feelings for Shizuka.

Episode list 
Final Approach has 13 episodes, with each episode lasting around 12 minutes (including the opening and the ending; this makes each episode lasting approximately 9 minutes.)

Music 
OP (Opening song) Kimiiro Palette by Sakura Nogawa (3:57)
ED (Ending song) Love, Fate, Love by Miyuki Hashimoto (4:42)

References

External links
 

2004 anime television series debuts
2004 video games
Harem anime and manga
Japan-exclusive video games
PlayStation 2 games
PlayStation 2-only games
Romantic comedy anime and manga
Video games developed in Japan
Visual novels
Zexcs
PrincessSoft games